Pavlos Saltsidis (born 17 July 1963) is a Greek weightlifter. He competed at the 1988 Summer Olympics, the 1992 Summer Olympics and the 1996 Summer Olympics. He was named the 1990 Greek Male Athlete of the Year.

References

1963 births
Living people
Greek male weightlifters
Olympic weightlifters of Greece
Weightlifters at the 1988 Summer Olympics
Weightlifters at the 1992 Summer Olympics
Weightlifters at the 1996 Summer Olympics
Sportspeople from Thessaloniki
World Weightlifting Championships medalists
20th-century Greek people
21st-century Greek people